Murray Keating (born 28 May 1952) is a Canadian athlete. He competed and finished in fourth place at the men's hammer throw at the 1976 Summer Olympics.

References

1952 births
Living people
Athletes (track and field) at the 1975 Pan American Games
Athletes (track and field) at the 1976 Summer Olympics
Canadian male hammer throwers
Olympic track and field athletes of Canada
People from Manning, Alberta
Sportspeople from Alberta
Pan American Games track and field athletes for Canada